Condé Nast Traveler is a luxury and lifestyle travel magazine published by Condé Nast. The magazine has won 25 National Magazine Awards.

The Condé Nast unit of Advance Publications purchased Signature, a magazine for Diners Club members, for $25 million in 1986. The company used it as the basis for Condé Nast Traveler, led by Sir Harold Evans (1928–2020) in 1987, with a focus on literary journalism and hard news reporting. As editor in chief, Evans coined the motto "Truth in Travel," which declared that travel industry freebies would not be accepted.

Condé Nast Traveler is currently led by Editor in Chief Melinda Stevens. The magazine is produced at Condé Nast's US headquarters at One World Trade Center in New York City. A separate UK edition, Condé Nast Traveller, is produced from Condé Nast's offices at Vogue House in London.

Condé Nast Traveler main competitor is Travel + Leisure.

Controversies 
Condé Nast Traveler, with the aid of social networking websites Facebook and YouTube, produced a series of videos officially titled Many People, Many Places, consisting of 13 videos. Each video lasts between three to four minutes long where over 70 people from 70 countries (including English-speaking countries) reveal how to say everyday phrases in their country of birth. The Filipino representative, an unidentified woman, counted numbers and money, sang Happy Birthday, said "Cheers!" in English rather than Tagalog, before stating that the Tagalog language lacked tongue twisters. Despite being able to sing the national anthem of the Philippines in Tagalog, the videos went viral on social media, with users complaining the woman was not properly portraying Filipino culture in comparison to the other representatives from the 70 other countries did. In response, Condé Nast Traveler admitted in a Facebook post that “[o]ne of our subjects, a Filipino woman, answered our questions in English rather than Tagalog based on her experience growing up and living in the Philippines... we appreciate your feedback and take seriously our responsibility to respectfully represent the many different aspects of the countries we cover at Condé Nast Traveler.”

References

External links
 Condé Nast Traveler US site at cntraveler.com
 Condé Nast Traveller UK site at cntraveller.com
 Condé Nast Traveller' India site at cntraveller.in
 Condé Nast Traveler History and Content
 
 

Traveler